Philippe Louviot (born 14 March 1964) is a former French racing cyclist. He won the French national road race title in 1990.

References

External links
 

1964 births
Living people
French male cyclists
Sportspeople from Nogent-sur-Marne
Cyclists from Île-de-France